These are the most popular given names in the United States for each respective year in the 1990s.

References
Social Security Administration's Popular Baby Names

Names
1990s